Lands' End is an American clothing and home decor retailer founded in 1963 and based in Dodgeville, Wisconsin, that specializes in casual clothing, luggage, and home furnishings. The majority of the company's business is conducted through mail order and Internet sales, but the company also has retail stores, primarily in the Upper Midwest, along with international shops in the UK, Germany, Japan, France and Austria. From 2002 to 2014, Lands' End was a subsidiary of Sears Holdings.

History
Lands' End began as a mail-order yachting supply company in 1963 in Chicago. It was founded by Gary Comer, along with his partners, 1963 Pan American Games gold medalist sailors Richard Stearns and Robert Halperin, and two of Stearns' employees. As the business became successful, it expanded into general clothing and home furnishings, and moved to Dodgeville, Wisconsin in 1978. The company is named from its sailboat heritage, after Land's End, but the misplaced apostrophe in the company name was a typographical error that Comer could not afford to change, as promotional materials had already been printed.

Lands' End's catalog business expanded in the 1980s, as  mail-order retail grew nationwide. The company expanded its computer systems and customer service operations. In 1986, it became a publicly traded company. The 1990s saw continued growth, as the company began international expansion and became an early embracer of e-commerce, establishing a website and "live chat" customer service. Lands' End was named among  the 100 Best Companies To Work For In America by FORTUNE Magazine.

In the late 1980s, Lands' End was  the jersey supplier of the United States national rugby union team.

In 2002, Sears acquired the company for $2 billion in cash. In addition to operating mail order and online business and Lands' End Inlet stores (a reverse pun used for its outlet stores), Sears offered a Lands' End clothing line in a large number of its retail stores. In 2012, the company formed an "online partnership" with the UK's Debenhams and House of Fraser department stores; in 2016 it began selling on Amazon.

In November 2009, Lands' End launched a new line called Lands' End Canvas, which offers a more fashion-oriented selection of casual clothing for men and women.

On December 6, 2013, Sears Holding Corp. announced that it would spin off Lands' End catalog business as a separate company by distributing stock to the retailer's stockholders. Lands' End stock began trading on the NASDAQ on April 7, 2014. Jerome Griffith became CEO in March 2017, succeeding Federica Marchionni.

In 2016, feminist activist Gloria Steinem was featured in the catalog of Lands' End. After an outcry from anti-abortion customers, the company removed Steinem from their website, stating on their Facebook page:  The company then faced further criticism online, this time both from customers who were still unhappy that Steinem had been featured in the first place, and customers who were unhappy that Steinem had been removed.

In 2019, Lands' End announced the closure of its remaining store-within-a-store branches in Sears stores, after Sears Holdings filed for Chapter 11 bankruptcy. The last of these closed by the end of 2019. As of the end of 2021, the company operates 30 retail stores.

References

External links
 

Retail companies established in 1963
Clothing brands of the United States
Companies based in Wisconsin
Mail-order retailers
Online retailers of the United States
Sears Holdings
Sears Holdings brands
Iowa County, Wisconsin
1963 establishments in Illinois
2014 initial public offerings
Companies listed on the Nasdaq